is Japanese voice actor Mamoru Miyano's sixth single, released on December 8, 2010. It peaked at No. 20 on the Oricon charts.

Track listing

References

2010 singles
J-pop songs
2010 songs
King Records (Japan) singles